Edita Kubelskienė (born 1 March 1974) is a former track and road cyclist from Lithuania. She represented her nation on the track at 2002, 2003 and 2004 and on the road at the 2004 UCI Road World Championships.

References

External links
 profile at Procyclingstats.com

1974 births
Lithuanian female cyclists
Living people
Place of birth missing (living people)